The women's 3000 metres competition at the 2020 European Speed Skating Championships was held on 11 January 2020.

Results
The race was started at 14:59.

References

Women's 3000 metres